His Majesty's Prison Service (HMPS) is a part of HM Prison and Probation Service (formerly the National Offender Management Service), which is the part of His Majesty's Government charged with managing most of the prisons within England and Wales (Scotland and Northern Ireland have their own prison services: the Scottish Prison Service and the Northern Ireland Prison Service, respectively).

The Director General of HMPS, currently Phil Copple, is the administrator of the prison service. The Director General reports to the Secretary of State for Justice and also works closely with the Prisons Minister, a junior ministerial post within the Ministry of Justice.

The statement of purpose for His Majesty's Prison Service states that "[His] Majesty's Prison Service serves the public by keeping in custody those committed by the courts. Our duty is to look after them with humanity and help them lead law abiding and useful lives in custody and after release". The Ministry of Justice's objective for prisons seeks "Effective execution of the sentences of the courts so as to reduce re-offending and protect the public".

It has its head office in Clive House in London, and previously its head office was in Cleland House in the City of Westminster, London.

The British Overseas Territory of Bermuda's HM Prison Service (renamed the Department of Corrections in 2002) is a separate organisation.

Operation
In 2004, the Prison Service was responsible for 130 prisons and employed around 44,000 staff.  the number of prisons had risen by one (of which 11 were privately owned).

Population statistics for the service are published weekly. Those for 24 June 2016 counted 85,130 prisoners; 95.47% were male. Those for the year to 31 March 2019 showed a fall to 83,013 (annual average); 95% were male.

HMPPS has a duty to implement the sentences and orders of the courts, to protect the public and to rehabilitate offenders. There are various ways a prisoner can be purposefully rehabilitated; including education, training, work and undertaking targeted accredited programmes.

Prisoners in England and Wales have a daily regime which might include employment and training on temporary licence outside of prison. In financial year 2018/19, 12,100 prisoners on average were employed in custody, delivering 17.1 million hours worked over the year. Average monthly net earnings per prisoner was £1,083 before the Prisoner Earnings Act (PEA) levy was applied.

On 31 March 2019, there were 37,735 staff in post. This was an increase of 2,452 staff on 31 March 2018, when a total of 35,293 were staff in post. Over the two-year period from 31 March 2017 to the latest year, 4,894 extra staff were in post (32,841 staff were in post on 31 March 2017).

Drug finds in prisons again rose; in the 12 months to March 2019, numbering 18,435; an increase of 41% over the previous alike period.

History

18th century
During the eighteenth century, British justice used a wide variety of measures to punish crime, including fines, the pillory and whipping. Transportation to the Thirteen American Colonies was often offered, until 1776, as an alternative to the death penalty, which could be imposed for many offences including pilfering. When they ran out of prisons in 1776 they used old sailing vessels which came to be called hulks as places of temporary confinement.

The most notable reformer was John Howard who, having visited several hundred prisons across England and Europe, beginning when he was high sheriff of Bedfordshire, published The State of the Prisons in 1777. He was particularly appalled to discover prisoners who had been acquitted but were still confined because they couldn't pay the jailer's fees. He proposed that each prisoner should be in a separate cell with separate sections for women felons, men felons, young offenders and debtors. The prison reform charity, the Howard League for Penal Reform, takes its name from John Howard.

The Penitentiary Act which passed in 1779 following his agitation introduced solitary confinement, religious instruction and a labor regime and proposed two state penitentiaries, one for men and one for women. These were never built due to disagreements in the committee and pressures from wars with France and jails remained a local responsibility. But other measures passed in the next few years provided magistrates with the powers to implement many of these reforms and eventually in 1815 jail fees were abolished.

19th century

Quakers such as Elizabeth Fry continued to publicise the dire state of prisons as did Charles Dickens in his novels David Copperfield and Little Dorrit about the Marshalsea. Samuel Romilly managed to repeal the death penalty for theft in 1806, but repealing it for other similar offences brought in a political element that had previously been absent. The Society for the Improvement of Prison Discipline, founded in 1816, supported both the Panopticon for the design of prisons and the use of the treadwheel as a means of hard labor. By 1824, 54 prisons had adopted this means of discipline. Robert Peel's Gaols Act 1823 attempted to impose uniformity in the country but local prisons remained under the control of magistrates until the Prison Act 1877.

The American separate system attracted the attention of some reformers and led to the creation of Millbank Prison in 1816 and Pentonville prison in 1842. By now the end of transportation to Australia and the use of hulks was in sight and Joshua Jebb set an ambitious program of prison building with one large prison opening per year.

1860–1914 
The main principles were separation and hard labour for serious crimes, using tread-wheels and cranks. However, by the 1860s public opinion was calling for harsher measures in reaction to an increase in crime which was perceived to come from the 'flood of criminals' released under the penal servitude system. The reaction from the committee set up under the commissioner of prisons, Colonel Edmund Frederick du Cane, was to increase minimum sentences for many offences with deterrent principles of 'hard labour, hard fare, and a hard bed'. In 1877 he encouraged Disraeli's government to remove all prisons from local government and held a firm grip on the prison system till his forced retirement in 1895. He also established a tradition of secrecy which lasted till the 1970s so that even magistrates and investigators were unable to see the insides of prisons. By the 1890s the prison population was over 20,000.

The British penal system underwent a transition from harsh punishment to reform, education, and training for post-prison livelihoods. The reforms were controversial and contested. In the 1877–1914 era a series of major legislative reforms enabled significant improvement in the penal system. In 1877, the previously localised prisons were nationalised in the Home Office under a Prison Commission. The Prison Act 1898 enabled the Home Secretary to enact multiple reforms on his own initiative, without going through the politicised process of Parliament. The Probation of Offenders Act 1907 introduced a new probation system that drastically cut down the prison population, while providing a mechanism for the transition back to normal life. The Criminal Justice Administration Act 1914 required courts to allow a reasonable time before imprisonment was ordered for people who did not pay their fines. Previously tens of thousands of prisoners had been sentenced solely for that reason. The Borstal system after 1908 was organised to reclaim young offenders, and the Children Act 1908 prohibited imprisonment under age 14, and strictly limited that of ages 14 to 16. The principal reformer was Sir Evelyn Ruggles-Brise, the chair of the Prison Commission.

Winston Churchill
Major reforms were championed by the Liberal Party government in 1906–14. The key player was Winston Churchill when he was the Liberal Home Secretary, 1910-11. He first achieved fame as a prisoner in the Boer war in 1899.  He escaped after 28 days and the media, and his own book, made him a national hero overnight. He later wrote, "I certainly hated my captivity more than I have ever hated any other in my whole life....Looking back on those days I've always felt the keenest pity for prisoners and captives." As Home Secretary he was in charge of the nation's penal system. Biographer Paul Addison says. "More than any other Home Secretary of the 20th century, Churchill was the prisoner's friend. He arrived at the Home Office with the firm conviction that the penal system was excessively harsh". He worked to reduce the number sent to prison in the first place, especially those imprisoned for their delay in paying fines, or for debts. He shortened their terms, and made life in prison more tolerable, and rehabilitation more likely. His reforms were not politically popular, but they had a major long-term impact on the British penal system.

Borstal system
In 1894–5 Herbert Gladstone's Committee on Prisons showed that criminal propensity peaked from the mid-teens to the mid-twenties. He took the view that central government should break the cycle of offending and imprisonment by establishing a new type of reformatory, that was called Borstal after the village in Kent which housed the first one. The movement reached its peak after the first world war when Alexander Paterson became commissioner, delegating authority and encouraging personal responsibility in the fashion of the English Public school: cellblocks were designated as 'houses' by name and had a housemaster. Cross-country walks were encouraged, and no one ran away. Prison populations remained at a low level until after the Second World War when Paterson died and the movement was unable to update itself.  Some aspects of Borstal found their way into the main prison system, including open prisons and housemasters (renamed assistant governors), and many Borstal-trained prison officers used their experience in the wider service. However, in general, the prison system in the twentieth century remained in Victorian buildings which steadily became more and more overcrowded with inevitable results.

21st century
Early in 2004, it was announced that the Prison Service would be integrated into a new National Offender Management Service later in the year.

, rationalisation of the prison management system is underway with the advent of the Titan Prison concept.

Six new reform prisons are to be built with prison governors in charge of operation and budget. Penal charities claimed reforms would fail if prisoners were "crammed into filthy institutions with no staff".

In 2017 the National Offender Management Service (NOMS) became Her Majesty's Prison and Probation Service (HMPPS), now known as His Majesty's Prison and Probation Service following Charles III's accession to the throne in September 2022.

Current issues
The imprisonment rate for England and Wales is the highest in western Europe, and at roughly the "midpoint" worldwide. The prison population numbered 83,165 in August 2018. The Ministry of Justice has projected that this will rise to 86,400 by March 2023. The government plans to increase the time some prisoners spend in prison.

Recent issues affecting the prison system include overcrowding, lower levels of staffing and the increased availability of synthetic cannabinoids and drones for smuggling. Despite a fall in crime rates between 2010 and 2016, the prison population continued to rise, while staff numbers were reduced, with the number of prison officers being reduced from 25,000 in 2010 to about 18,000 in 2015. There has been a particularly sharp rise in the number of prisoners above the age of 60. The head of the Prison Governors' Association suggested in 2017 that prison sentences of less than a year should be replaced with alternative punishments. Another issue is the age of several prisons. A 2015 announcement from the government agreed that old prisons are more expensive to run and often unsuitable in design, such as having "dark corners which too often facilitate violence and drug-taking."

In July 2018, the Government announced "a £30 million investment including £16 million to improve conditions for prisoners and staff and £7 million on new security measures, including airport-security style scanners, improved searching techniques and phone-blocking technology".

In The Lammy Review, a report commissioned by the Conservative government and led by David Lammy MP, it was found that whilst adult prison populations are 24% BAME individuals, only 6% of prison staff were from Black and Minority Ethnic communities. This was one of the significant factors listed as the cause for mis-trust between BAME prisoners and prison staff which then impacts the percentage of black and minority ethnic prisoners that have access to rehabilitation programmes in prison and therefore, increase their chances of re-offending after leaving prison.

Prison officers

Recent development
Historically, uniformed prison staff were under the supervision of a small number of very senior and experienced officers who held one of three chief officer ranks. Below these were the ranks of principal officer (rank badgetwo Bath stars) and senior officer (rank badgesingle Bath star). However, as a reorganisation in the 1980s, termed "A Fresh Start", saw these chief officer ranks abolished, and their role taken by junior grade prison governors.

From 2000 onwards, as part of a process to increase accountability within the prison service, all operational officers have been assigned a three-digit unique identification number, worn on all items of uniform (typically as an embroidered epaulette) along with the two-digit LIDS identification code of the specific prison or institution. From 2010 onwards, attempts were made to replace the principal officer rank with non-uniformed junior managers (developing prison service managers – DPSM), although this process was neither entirely successful nor fully implemented. Further restructuring in 2013, known as "Fair & Sustainable", saw the remaining historic ranks and rank insignia phased out in favour of a new structure, and simple stripes on uniform epaulettes to indicate grades.

Uniforms
Prison officers wear a white shirt and black tie, black trousers, black boots, black 'woolly-pully' jumper and/or black soft shell fleece-jacket.

Prison officers working in the Juvenile or Immigration Detention estate wear a 'soft uniform' consisting of a polo shirt opposed to white shirt with black tie.

For formal occasions, a dark tunic with whistle on a chain is worn with a tie and peaked cap for men and bowler cap and open collar for women. Black gloves and shoes are worn, as are any medals/ribbons that have been awarded. Rank is worn on epaulettes and on the shoulders of uniforms.

Powers and structure
Public sector prison officers (historically known as warders), under the Prison Act 1952, have "all the powers, authority, protection and privileges of a constable" whilst acting as such.

Under the Assaults on Emergency Workers (Offences) Act 2018 it is an offence to assault (amongst others) a prison officer and is punishable by up to twelve months in prison, as well as a fine. Murder of a prison officer who was acting in the execution of their duty at the time can result in a whole life order being imposed.

Although the system is flexible in operation, most prison officers work in small teams, either assigned to a specific duty, or providing one shift of staff for the supervision of a particular wing within a prison.

Each such team is, in many instances, led by a supervising officer.

There will be an overall manager of the wing with the title of custodial manager. Custodial managers will have direct management of the wing and the line management of the officers and supervising officers.

Equipment
Most prison officers, when working on the landings, will carry:

baton – usually an Monadnock AutoLock 21” in length, for self-defence
radio – for communication between officers and the control room
keys – worn on a long key-chain
body cameras – worn on the chest
rigid-bar handcuff – TCH 842 like the Hiatt speedcuffs type are being phased in as part of general issue kit
PAVA spray – see below.

In 2018, it was reported by the GOV UK website that prison officers would start to be equipped with PAVA incapacitating spray:

The government said that it would be "fully rolled put by April 2019" and that "the decision follows a successful trial by HM Prison and Probation Service (HMPPS) at 4 prisons". The four prisons that were involved in the trial were: HMPs Hull, Preston, Risley and Wealstun.

Rank insignia

Location prefixes
 AY: HMP Aylesbury
 WK: HMP Wakefield
 BF: HMP Bedford
 BA: HMP Belmarsh
 BL: HMP Bristol
 BN: HMP Bullingdon
 BM: HMP Birmingham
 BS: HMP Brinsford
 BW: HMP Berwyn
 BX: HMP Brixton
 CD: HMP/YOI Chelmsford
 CF: HMP Cardiff
 CW: HMP Channings Wood
 DM: HMP Durham
 DT: HMP Deerbolt
 DW: HMP Downview
 EE: HMP Erlestoke
 EY: HMP Elmley
 EX: HMP Exeter
 FK: HMP Frankland
 FM: HMP/YOI Feltham
 FS: HMP Featherstone
 FD: HMP Ford
 GH: HMP Garth
 HV: HMP Haverigg
 HC: HMP Huntercombe
 HE: HMP Hewell
 HH: HMP Holme House
 HL: HMP Hull
 HM: HMP Humber
 HO: HMP High Down
 HP: HMP Highpoint
 IS: HMP/YOI Isis
 KV: HMP Kirklevington Grange
 LE: HMP Leeds
 LF: HMP Lancaster Farms
 LI: HMP Lincoln
 LH: HMP Lindholme
 LL: HMP Long Lartin
 LP: HMP Liverpool
 LW: HMP Lewes
 MD: HMP Moorland
 MR: HMP Manchester
 MH: HMP Morton Hall
 MT: HMP The Mount
 NM: HMP Nottingham
 PD: HMP Portland 
 PV: HMP Pentonville
 PN: HMP Preston
 RS: HMP Risley
 SF: HMP Stafford
 ST: HMP Styal
 SW: HMP Swansea
 UK: HMP Usk and Prescoed
 WD: HMP Wakefield
 WE: HMP Wealstun
 WL: HMP Wayland
 WM: HMP Whitemoor
 WC: HMP Winchester
 WS: HMP Wormwood Scrubs
 WW: HMP Wandsworth

Specialist roles
In addition to uniformed officers carrying out security and custodial roles, a number of specialist functions exist within every prison. Some are assigned to uniformed specialist officers, while others are carried out by non-uniformed support staff.

Before the "Fresh Start" initiative there were more uniformed specialist officer roles, including dog handlers, works officers, hospital officers, catering officers, physical education officers, and officer instructors. Today the uniformed Specialist Officer roles include dog handlers (DH), works officers (W), and healthcare officers (H) and Physical Exercise Instructors (PEI) who are the successors of the former hospital officers. The roles of the former catering officers, PE officers, and officer instructors are today taken by non-uniformed caterers, PE instructors, and educational/vocational instructors. Other key non-uniformed roles within the staff of a prison include chaplains, psychologists, and administrators.

Private prisons
Privately managed prisons were introduced in the 1990s. Currently, there are 15 prisons in the UK run by third parties including: HMP Altcourse, HMP Ashfield, HMP Bronzefield, HMP Doncaster, HMP Dovegate, HMP Five Wells HMP Forest Bank, HMP Lowdham Grange, HMP Oakwood, HMP Parc, HMP Peterborough, HMP Rye Hill, HMP Thameside and HMP Northumberland. These are run by three third party contractor companies: G4S, Serco and Sodexo.

Ban on industrial action
Questions were raised about the status of the POA (Prison Officers' Association) in the 1990s. In 1994, a legal decision determined that it was illegal to induce prison officers to take industrial action – a law which had applied to police officers since 1919 – meaning that the POA could not call strike action amongst its members. New labour legislation introduced by the Conservative government in 1992 laid down that the POA could no longer be a trade union. This was reversed in the Criminal Justice and Public Order Act 1994, but prison officers were still denied the right to take industrial action. This right was restored in 2004 to prison officers in the public sector in England, Wales and Scotland, but not in Northern Ireland or to prison custody officers in the private sector.

On 29 August 2007, the POA started a 24-hour walkout of prisons, picketing establishments asking prison officers not to attend work for their shift. This was the first ever national strike action taken by the POA. The POA reported that 90% of its members (27,000) went on strike that day.

In January 2008, the Home Secretary announced that the government was to introduce legislation to remove the right for prison officers in England and Wales to take strike action. In November 2016, the High Court approved a government request to stop industrial action taking place. In July 2017 the government won a High Court bid to obtain a permanent ban on industrial action by prison officers.

Independent Monitoring Board
Every prison and immigration removal centre has an Independent Monitoring Board (IMB), formerly known as a Board of Visitors. Members of the IMB, who are volunteers, are appointed by the Home Secretary and act as 'watchdogs' for both the Minister of Prisons and the general public, to ensure that proper standards of care and decency are maintained. An analysis of the reporting of IMBs found that while there may be some problems with their training and undertaking of duties, their monitoring and surveillance of the detention estate can be more than symbolic and may further the humane and just treatment of the state's most vulnerable citizens.

HMPS in the National Offender Management Service
On 6 January 2004, then Home Secretary David Blunkett announced that the Prison Service, together with the National Probation Service, was to be integrated into a new National Offender Management Service.  The Service, Blunkett said, will be "a new body to provide end-to-end management of all offenders".

On 1 April 2008, NOMS was reorganised as part of a shake-up in the Ministry of Justice.  The headquarters and regional structures of NOMS and HMPS were merged into a single HQ structure with Phil Wheatly as Director General of NOMS.  This brings HMPS and the National Probation Service under a single headquarters structure for the first time ever.

On 1 June 2011, NOMS was merged with the wider MoJ (HMCTS etc.) to form one organisation. Although HMCTS and NOMS are working under different terms and conditions, they are now managed together and HR is dealt with by one Shared Service centre. A review of terms and conditions for all MoJ staff, including NOMS, is currently in progress with view to bringing all staff terms and conditions across NOMS and HMCTS in line.

See also

His Majesty's prison service collection is held at the Galleries of Justice Museum in Nottingham.

 HM Prison
 His Majesty's Inspectorate of Prisons
 His Majesty's Young Offender Institution
 List of United Kingdom prisons
 Northern Ireland Prison Service
 OASys
 Prison Reform Trust
 Prison categories in the United Kingdom
 Scottish Prison Service
 Temporary licence
 United Kingdom prison population
 Young offender

References

External links 
 
 Press release from Home Office about re-organisation
 Prison Officer learning program

Law enforcement agencies of England and Wales
 
Prison and correctional agencies